Salvia subgenus Perovskia is a group of species within the flowering plant genus Salvia, which prior 2017 were treated as the separate genus Perovskia. Members of the group are native to southwestern and central Asia. It includes the garden plant Russian sage (Salvia yangii).

The subgenus and former genus are named after the Russian general V. A. Perovski (1794-1857).

Species
 Salvia abrotanoides (Kar.) Systma - Tibet, Kyrgyzstan, Turkmenistan, Afghanistan, Iran, Pakistan, western Himalayas of northern India
 Salvia bungei J.G.González, formerly Perovskia virgata Kudrjasch. - Tajikistan
 Salvia karelinii J.B.Walker, formerly Perovskia angustifolia Kudrjasch.  - Kyrgyzstan, Tajikistan
 Salvia klokovii J.B.Walker, formerly Perovskia linczevskii Kudrjasch. - Tajikistan
 Salvia kudrjaschevii (Gorschk. & Pjataeva) Systma - Kyrgyzstan, Kazakhstan
 Salvia pobedimovae J.G.González, formerly Perovskia botschantzevii Kovalevsk & Kochk. - Kyrgyzstan, Tajikistan, Afghanistan
 Salvia scrophulariifolia (Bunge) B.T.Drew - Kyrgyzstan, Tajikistan
 Salvia yangii B.T.Drew, formerly Perovskia atriplicifolia Benth. – Russian sage - Afghanistan, Pakistan, western Himalayas, Tibet, Xinjiang

Hybrids
 Perovskia × intermedia Lazkov - Kyrgyzstan: (P. abrotanoides × P. angustifolia) (S. abrotanoides × S. kareliniii)

Cultivation
Plants in cultivation are often Salvia 'Blue Spire' (syn. Perovskia 'Blue Spire'), thought to be a hybrid between the entire-leaved Salvia yangii and Salvia abrotanoides. The leaves of this cultivar have long narrow teeth (i.e. are laciniate), unlike S. yangii which has entire leaves with shallow teeth.

References

External links

Salvia
Plant subgenera
Flora of Asia